

a
A-Hydrocort
A-Methapred
A-N stannous aggregated albumin
A-Poxide
A.P.L.
A/T/S

ab
abacavir (INN)
abafungin (INN)
abagovomab (INN)
abamectin (INN)
abanoquil (INN)
abarelix (INN)
abatacept (USAN)
Abasol (York Pharma)
Abbokinase
ABC Pack
ABCD
abciximab (INN)
abecarnil (INN)
abediterol (INN)
Abegrin
Abelcet (Sigma-Tau), also known as amphotericin B
Abenol
abexinostat (USAN, INN)
Abilify (Bristol-Myers Squibb), also known as aripiprazole
abiraterone (INN)
abitesartan (INN)
Abitrexate, methotrexate sodium salt
ABLC
ablukast (INN)
Abreva (GlaxoSmithKline)
abrineurin (INN)
abunidazole (INN)